En la Palma de Tu Mano (In the Palm of Your Hand) is a 1951 Mexican crime drama film directed by Roberto Gavaldón. The film received eleven nominations and won eight Ariel Awards in 1952, including Best Picture and Best Director.

It was shot at the Churubusco Studios in Mexico City. The film's sets were designed by the art director Francisco Marco Chillet.

Main cast
Arturo de Córdova as Jaime Karín
Leticia Palma as Ada Cisneros de Romano
Carmen Montejo as Clara Stein
Ramón Gay as León Romano
Consuelo Guerrero de Luna as Señorita Arnold
Enriqueta Reza as Carmelita

Awards

Ariel Awards
The Ariel Awards are awarded annually by the Mexican Academy of Film Arts and Sciences in Mexico. En la Palma de Tu Mano received eight awards out of eleven nominations.

|-
|rowspan="11" scope="row"| 1952
|scope="row"| Producciones Mier y Brooks
|rowspan="1" scope="row"| Best Picture
| 
|-
|scope="row"| Roberto Gavaldón
|rowspan="1" scope="row"| Best Director
| 
|-
|scope="row"| Arturo de Córdova
|rowspan="1" scope="row"| Best Actor
| 
|-
|scope="row"| Tana Lynn
|rowspan="1" scope="row"| Best Actress in a Minor Role
| 
|-
|scope="row"| Luis Spota
|rowspan="1" scope="row"| Best Original Story
| 
|-
|rowspan="1" scope="row"| José Revueltas, Roberto Gavaldón
|rowspan="1" scope="row"| Best Adapted Screenplay
| 
|-
|rowspan="1" scope="row"| Alex Phillips
|rowspan="1" scope="row"| Best Cinematography
| 
|-
|rowspan="1" scope="row"| Charles L. Kimball
|rowspan="1" scope="row"| Best Editing
| 
|-
|rowspan="1" scope="row"| Raúl Lavista
|rowspan="1" scope="row"| Best Score
| 
|-
|rowspan="1" scope="row"| Rodolfo Benítez
|rowspan="1" scope="row"| Best Sound
| 
|-
|rowspan="1" scope="row"| Francisco Marco Chillet
|rowspan="1" scope="row"| Best Set Design
| 
|-

External links

References

1951 films
1951 crime drama films
Best Picture Ariel Award winners
Mexican crime drama films
1950s Spanish-language films
Mexican black-and-white films
1950s Mexican films